Altuğ Çelikbilek was the defending champion but lost in the first round to Alejandro Moro Cañas.

Constant Lestienne won the title after defeating Grégoire Barrère 6–0, 7–6(7–3) in the final.

Seeds

Draw

Finals

Top half

Bottom half

References

External links
Main draw
Qualifying draw

Open de Tenis Ciudad de Pozoblanco - 1
2022 Singles